KZZJ (1450 AM) is a radio station licensed to serve Rugby, North Dakota. The station is owned by Rugby Broadcasters, Inc. Its studios and transmitter are at 230 Hwy 2 SE in Rugby.

It airs a country music format.

The station was assigned the KZZJ call letters by the Federal Communications Commission on February 11, 1985.

New sister station
KZZJ added another station. KKWZ-FM (95.3), originally licensed to Crary, ND. After the sale, it moved its transmitter 65 miles west to Rugby. KKWZ now broadcasts with 6 kW from KZZJ's transmitter tower, license changed to Rugby.

References

External links
KZZJ official website

ZZJ
Country radio stations in the United States
Radio stations established in 1959
Rugby, North Dakota